Naoko is a feminine Japanese given name.

Naoko may also refer to:

 Naoko, a 2007 film starring Juri Ueno
 Naoko (novel), the English title of the 1999 novel Himitsu by Keigo Higashino
 14925 Naoko, a main-belt asteroid